The Stadium is a cirque with mountains on three sides but open on the east, located 1 mi north of Walker Point on Elephant Island in the South Shetland Islands of Antarctica. The floor of this feature is occupied by a homonymous glacier feeding the head of Gurkovska Cove. Mapped by the U.K. Joint Services Expedition to Elephant Island, 1970–71. UK Antarctic Place-names Committee (UK-APC) applied the descriptive name for this bowl-shaped feature.

References

Landforms of the South Shetland Islands
Elephant Island